Vertical is a geometric term of location which may refer to:

 Vertical direction, the direction aligned with the direction of the force of gravity, up or down
 Vertical (angles), a pair of angles opposite each other, formed by two intersecting straight lines that form an "X"
 Vertical (music), a musical interval where the two notes sound simultaneously
 "Vertical", a type of wine tasting in which different vintages of the same wine type from the same winery are tasted
 Vertical Aerospace, stylised as "Vertical", British aerospace manufacturer
 Vertical Kilometer, a discipline of skyrunning
 Vertical market, a market in which vendors offer goods and services specific to an industry

Media 
 Vertical (1967 film), Soviet movie starring Vladimir Vysotsky
 "Vertical" (Sledge Hammer!), 1987 television episode
 Vertical (novel), 2010 novel by Rex Pickett
 Vertical Entertainment, an American independent film distributor and production company
 Vertical (publisher), a novel and manga imprint of Kodansha USA
 Vertikal, a 2013 album by the Swedish band Cult of Luna

See also 
 Vertical integration, a management term describing a style of ownership and control
 Vertical blinds, a type of window blind
 Vertical jump, a measure of how high an individual or athlete can elevate off the ground from a standstill
 Vertical loop, a section of roller coaster track which causes the riders to complete a 360 degree turn
 Horizontal (disambiguation)
 ↕, see Arrow (symbol)#Arrows in Unicode